Discosoma is a genus of cnidarians in the order Corallimorpharia. Common names for the genus include mushroom anemone, disc anemone and elephant ear mushroom.

Most species are disc-shaped and produce large amounts of mucus. There are a great variety of colors, including metallic and fluorescent shades and striped and spotted patterns. Discosoma gather food particles from the water. Some species absorb nutrients produced by zooxanthellae, photosynthetic dinoflagellates living in their tissues in a symbiotic relationship.

Some species are sold commercially in the aquarium trade.

The red fluorescent protein dTomato which has applications in molecular biology as a reporter protein was first derived from the species.

There are approximately 11 recognized species:
Discosoma album
Discosoma carlgreni – Forked-tentacle corallimorpharian
Discosoma dawydoffi
Discosoma fowleri
Discosoma fungiforme
Discosoma molle
Discosoma neglecta – Umbrella corallimorpharian
Discosoma nummiforme
Discosoma rubraoris
Discosoma unguja
Discosoma viridescens

References

Discosomidae
Hexacorallia genera